Vilmar, also known as Wilmar, is an unincorporated community in Butler County, Iowa, United States. It lies west of Iowa Highway 14 5.5 miles southwest of the community of Greene.  Its elevation is 1,053 feet.

History
Vilmar was founded by German families. The German Evangelical Lutheran St. Johannes Church was built in 1883, the grounds included a parsonage and confirmation school. St. John's Lutheran Church - Vilmar still operates in the community.

Vilmar's population was 21 in 1915, and 15 in 1925.

References

Unincorporated communities in Butler County, Iowa
Unincorporated communities in Iowa